Offenhausen may refer to:

 Offenhausen, Austria
 Offenhausen, Germany